Posh residential district Vitória centers on Sete Setembro Avenue, lined with giant mango trees and luxury condos overlooking the bay. Mansions-turned-museums on the avenue include Museu de Arte de Bahia, with its regional paintings and sculpture, and Carlos Costa Pinto Museum, which exhibits jewelry, furnishings, and art from colonial times. Concerts in the courtyard are among the draws at the Goethe Institute. It is located in the southern zone of Salvador, Bahia, Brazil.

References

Neighbourhoods in Salvador, Bahia